Digitosa is a genus of moths belonging to the subfamily Tortricinae of the family Tortricidae. It is found in Madagascar.

Species
Digitosa elliptica Diakonoff, 1960
Digitosa gnesia Diakonoff, 1960
Digitosa leptographa Diakonoff, 1960
Digitosa metaxantha Diakonoff, 1960
Digitosa stenographa Diakonoff, 1970
Digitosa vulpina Diakonoff, 1960

See also
List of Tortricidae genera

References

External links
tortricidae.com

Archipini
Tortricidae genera